Presenzano is a comune (municipality) in the Province of Caserta in the Italian region Campania, located about  north of Naples and about  northwest of Caserta.

Presenzano borders the following municipalities: Conca della Campania, Marzano Appio, Mignano Monte Lungo, Pratella, Sesto Campano, Tora e Piccilli, Vairano Patenora.

Notable people
Adriana Giramonti - chef

References

Cities and towns in Campania